The Old English Pheasant Fowl is a British breed of small utility chicken. It derives from traditional breeds of rural Lancashire and Yorkshire and of the former counties of Cumberland and Westmorland. Its name is due to a perceived similarity of the plumage to that of the wild pheasant. It is a rare breed, and in 2014 was listed as "at risk" by the Rare Breeds Survival Trust.

History 

Mostly concentrated around Yorkshire and Lancashire, it was named and a breed club was formed in 1914. They are thought by some to be one of the precursors of the Hamburgh breed. In the 21st century, the Old English Pheasant Fowl is extremely rare. It is listed as "at risk" in the 2014 watch list of the Rare Breeds Survival Trust.

Characteristics 

They have rose-type combs and white earlobes. Their plumage is a mahogany hue with darker lacing around the edges.

Use 

It is a hardy bird that does well in free range conditions as a table bird and a layer of white eggs.

See also
 List of chicken breeds

References

Chicken breeds originating in the United Kingdom
Chicken breeds
Animal breeds on the RBST Watchlist